Híjar is a municipality located in the province of Teruel, Aragon, Spain. In 2009 the municipality had a population of 1,900 inhabitants.

The town is noted for the well-preserved, 15th century Synagogue, and for the Gothic-Mudejar church of Santa María la Mayor.

Twin towns
 Tobarra, Spain

Municipalities in the Province of Teruel